The men's coxed pair competition at the 1948 Summer Olympics in London took place at Henley-on-Thames, London. It was held from 5 to 9 August. There were 9 boats (28 competitors) from 9 nations, with each nation limited to a single boat in the event. The event was won by the Danish team, rowers Finn Pedersen and Tage Henriksen and coxswain Carl-Ebbe Andersen; it was the first medal in the men's coxed pair for Denmark. Italy won its second consecutive silver medal (though 12 years apart), with Giovanni Steffè, Aldo Tarlao, and cox Alberto Radi. Hungary also earned its first medal in the event, a bronze for Antal Szendey, Béla Zsitnik, and cox Róbert Zimonyi. The French three-Games pre-war podium streak ended.

Background

This was the seventh appearance of the event. Rowing had been on the programme in 1896 but was cancelled due to bad weather. The men's coxed pair was one of the original four events in 1900, but was not held in 1904, 1908, or 1912. It returned to the programme after World War I and was held every Games from 1924 to 1992, when it (along with the men's coxed four) was replaced with the men's lightweight double sculls and men's lightweight coxless four.

None of the 18 competitors from the 1936 coxed pair final returned. The Hungarian rowers were a slight favorite; Antal Szendey and Béla Zsitnik were the reigning European champions.

Argentina, Great Britain, and Greece each made their debut in the event. France made its seventh appearance, the only nation to have competed in all editions of the event to that point.

Competition format

The coxed pair event featured three-person boats, with two rowers and a coxswain. It was a sweep rowing event, with the rowers each having one oar (and thus each rowing on one side). The tournament expanded to four rounds: quarterfinals, a repechage, semifinals, and a final.

The venue, Henley-on-Thames, imposed certain restrictions and modifications to the format. The course could handle only three boats at a time (and this required expansion of the typical Henley course), so the six-boat final introduced in 1936 was not possible this time. The course distance was also modified; instead of either the 2000 metres distance that was standard for the Olympics or the 1 mile 550 yards (2112 metres) standard at Henley, a course that was somewhat shorter than either was used. Sources disagree on the exact distance: 1929 metres is listed by the Official Report, though other sources say 1850 metres.

 Quarterfinals: There were 4 quarterfinals, ranging from 1 to 3 boats each. The winner of each heat (4 boats total) advanced directly to the semifinals; all other boats (5 boats total) went to the repechage.
 Repechage: There were 2 repechage heats, with 2 or 3 boats each. The winner of each heat (2 boats) rejoined the quarterfinal winners in the semifinals; all other boats (3 total) were eliminated.
 Semifinals: There were 3 semifinals, each with 2 boats. The winner of each heat advanced to the final; the remaining boats were eliminated.
 Final: A single final, with 3 boats.

Schedule

All times are British Summer Time (UTC+1)

Results

The following rowers took part:

Quarterfinals

Quarterfinal 1

Quarterfinal 2

Quarterfinal 3

Quarterfinal 4

Repechage

Repechage heat 1

Repechage heat 2

Semifinals

Semifinal 1

Semifinal 2

Semifinal 3

Final

Results summary

References

External links
 Official Olympic Report

Rowing at the 1948 Summer Olympics